The 'College of Dentistry at the Imam Abdulrahman bin Faisal University is a school of Dentistry associated with the Imam Abdulrahman bin Faisal University; its purpose is to disseminate knowledge of all disciplines of dentistry and promote development in dental education, treatment, and research.

The College of Dentistry was founded in 2001-2002 AD under the patronage of King Faisal University, Dammam. It is the first dental college in the Eastern Province and the third dental educational institution in the Kingdom of Saudi Arabia.

Deans of the College of Dentistry
There have been four deans of the College:
Prof. Dr. Abdulsalam Abdullah Al Sulaiman (2001-2005) - Founding Dean
Prof. Dr. Abdullah Mohammad Al Rubaish (2005-2007)
Dr. Ra'ed Mohammad Bukhari (2007-2009)
Prof. Fahad Ahmed Al Harbi (2009–2019)
Dr. Jehan Ahmed AlHumaid (2019–Present)

Vice Deans
 Dr. Muhanad Alhareky, Vice Dean for Academic Affairs
 Dr. Faisal Al Onaizan, Vice Dean for Clinical Affairs 
 Dr. Suliman Shahin, Vice Dean for Studies Development and Community Service
 Dr. Faisal Alqarni, Vice Dean for  Postgraduate Studies and Scientific Research
 Dr. Maram AlGhamdi, Vice Dean for Female Student Affairs

Departments

Biomedical Dental Sciences
Dept. Head: Dr. Amr Bugshan

Oral and Maxillofacial Surgery
In this division, the students are trained on the clinical skills necessary for tooth extraction. They are also trained to apply different surgical techniques to manage aesthetic and prosthetic situations, trauma, and tumors.

Oral Biology
Is the study of the basic biological characteristics of the oral tissue and peri-oral areas in health and their application in sickness

Oral Radiology
In this division, students learn the physics of radiation, how to make radiographs and how to interpret them.

Oral Diagnosis
This division aims to teach and train the students the modern techniques used in diagnosis of oral diseases.

Preventive Dental Sciences
Dept. Head: Dr. Muhanad Alhareky

Orthodontics
Dr. Essam Nassar
Dr. Naif Al Masoud
Dr. Suliman Shahin

Periodontics
Dr. Khalid Al Mas
Dr. Adel Alagl
Dr. Steph Smith
Dr. Abdulkareem Al Hhmaidan

Pedodontics
Dr. Azza Taguldin
Dr. Yousef Al Yousef
Dr. Jehan AL Humaid
Dr. Muhannad Alhareky
Dr. Sumit Bedi 
Dr. Eman Bakhurji
Dr. Mazin Alqahtani

Community Dental Health and Public Health
Dr. Khalifa Al Khalifa
Dr. Asim Al Ansari
Dr. Balgis Gaffar

Restorative Dental Sciences
Dept. Head: Dr. Khalid AlMulhim

Endodontics
Dr. Emad AlShwaimi

Operative Dentistry
Bio-Dental Material

Substitutive Dental Sciences
Dept. Head: Dr. Yousif AlDulaijan

Fixed Prosthodontics
Advanced Prosthodontics
Removable Prosthodontics

Dr. Amr Mahrous

General information

Admission requirements
To be admitted to the College of Dentistry, the students must:
 Hold Saudi Nationality
 Hold Saudi high school certificate, science section or its equivalent
 Not have exceeded two years from the date of graduation from high school
 Be of good behavior and conduct
 Pass the professional health assessment
 Pass the examination of the National Center for Assessment

Academic counseling
As the university colleges and programs for study are diversified, the college administration is very keen to prepare, develop and apply special counseling programs to orient and advise students on curriculum, study courses, college departments and available student's activities. This starts from admission to the college and continues throughout the years of study. The students are arranged in small groups, each supervised by one faculty staff member.

The aim of Academic counseling is to recognize problems and difficulties, which the students may encounter during their studies, as well as to encourage their participation and cooperation with their colleagues in other colleges to interact with the community.

Student activities
The aim of the students' activities is to utilize the students leisure time in useful activities. Both the students and the faculty staff participate in these activities through a number of committees.

Teaching aids
The College of Dentistry has an audiovisual unit, which provides teaching aid services, overhead and transparent projectors, models, mannequins, modern computer display equivalent, televisions, videos and cassette recorders; it also provide medical photography services for the faculty staff and students. Along with this there is a computer laboratory for students, not only to enhance their computer skills but to use this powerful tool for learning as well.

Community services
One of the main purposes of the College of Dentistry is to improve the health awareness and education of all community members. The community dentistry department organize  and conducts outreach programs and symposia, which cover the health centers and other community service centers and facilities.the community dentistry department also provides oral health care education and treatment for residents of social care homes.
The College provides many activities in this field such as:
 Annual Dental Symposium (ADS)
 Monthly educational and scientific lectures
 Training courses

References

2001 establishments in Saudi Arabia
Educational institutions established in 2001
Imam Abdulrahman Bin Faisal University
Universities and colleges in Saudi Arabia